Dondarlı (also, Dondarly) is a village in the Tovuz Rayon of Azerbaijan.  The village forms part of the municipality of Sarıtala.

References 

Populated places in Tovuz District